Chrysolampra is a genus of leaf beetles in the subfamily Eumolpinae. It is distributed in Asia and Australia. It is very closely related to Colaspoides, and is possibly a subgenus of it according to L. N. Medvedev (2004).

Species

 Chrysolampra angustula Weise, 1923
 Chrysolampra bicolorata Jacoby, 1908
 Chrysolampra burmanica Jacoby, 1908
 Chrysolampra cuprithorax Chen, 1935
 Chrysolampra curvipes Jacoby, 1899
 Chrysolampra cyanea Lefèvre, 1884
 Chrysolampra dentipes Medvedev, 2006
 Chrysolampra fedorenkoi Medvedev, 2006
 Chrysolampra flavipes Jacoby, 1899
 Chrysolampra hirta Tan, 1982
 Chrysolampra imbecilla Weise, 1923
 Chrysolampra indica Jacoby, 1908
 Chrysolampra kimotoi Medvedev, 2006
 Chrysolampra laosensis Kimoto & Gressitt, 1982
 Chrysolampra longitarsis Tan, 1982
 Chrysolampra malayana Medvedev, 2016
 Chrysolampra manipurensis Jacoby, 1908
 Chrysolampra medvedevi Moseyko & Sprecher-Uebersax, 2010
 Chrysolampra minuta Jacoby, 1892
 Chrysolampra mjoebergi Weise, 1923
 Chrysolampra modesta Weise, 1923
 Chrysolampra monstrosa Tan, 1988
 Chrysolampra mouhoti Baly, 1864
 Chrysolampra nathani Medvedev, 2000
 Chrysolampra purpurea Medvedev, 2010
 Chrysolampra rufimembris Pic, 1926
 Chrysolampra rugosa Tan, 1982
 Chrysolampra smaragdula (Boheman, 1859)
 Chrysolampra splendens Baly, 1859
 Chrysolampra subaenea Jacoby, 1908
 Chrysolampra thailandica Medvedev, 2006
 Chrysolampra thoracica Jacoby, 1899
 Chrysolampra varicolor Jacoby, 1892
 Chrysolampra viridicollis Jacoby, 1908
 Chrysolampra viridis Weise, 1923
 Chrysolampra weigeli Medvedev, 2018

Synonyms:
 Chrysolampra minuta Kimoto & Gressitt, 1982 nec Jacoby, 1892: renamed to Chrysolampra kimotoi Medvedev, 2006
 Chrysolampra tuberculata Medvedev, 2005 nec Pic, 1926: renamed to Chrysolampra medvedevi Moseyko & Sprecher-Uebersax, 2010

References

External links
 Genus Chrysolampra Baly, 1859 at Australian Faunal Directory

Chrysomelidae genera
Eumolpinae
Beetles of Asia
Beetles of Australia
Taxa named by Joseph Sugar Baly